= Scientific Research Organisation of Samoa =

Government organisation in Samoa

Coordinates: 13°51′15.94″S 171°45′41.85″W

Agency overview
- Formed: 2006
- Headquarters: Nafanua, Apia
- Employees: 60 in 2018
- Agency executive: Dr Joseph Tauati

The Scientific Research Organisation of Samoa (SROS) is a government scientific organisation based in Samoa. It is structured as a statutory body under the Scientific Research Organisation of Samoa Act 2006.

SROS has a focus on agricultural products, including Biodiesel from coconut oil, gluten-free breadfruit flour, and taro whiskey.

== History ==
The Scientific Research Organisation of Samoa was originally established as the Research and Development Institute of Samoa in 2006. Its empowering legislation, the Research and Development Institute of Samoa Act 2006, gave it objectives to:

- promote the national economy of Samoa based on research and development
- undertake scientific and technical research with the primary aim of adding value to local resources or services
- develop functional prototypes of products and processes based on scientific and technical research for the local or overseas markets
- establish partnership with the private sector and commercial interests to support the Institute's activities
- support the teaching of science and technology

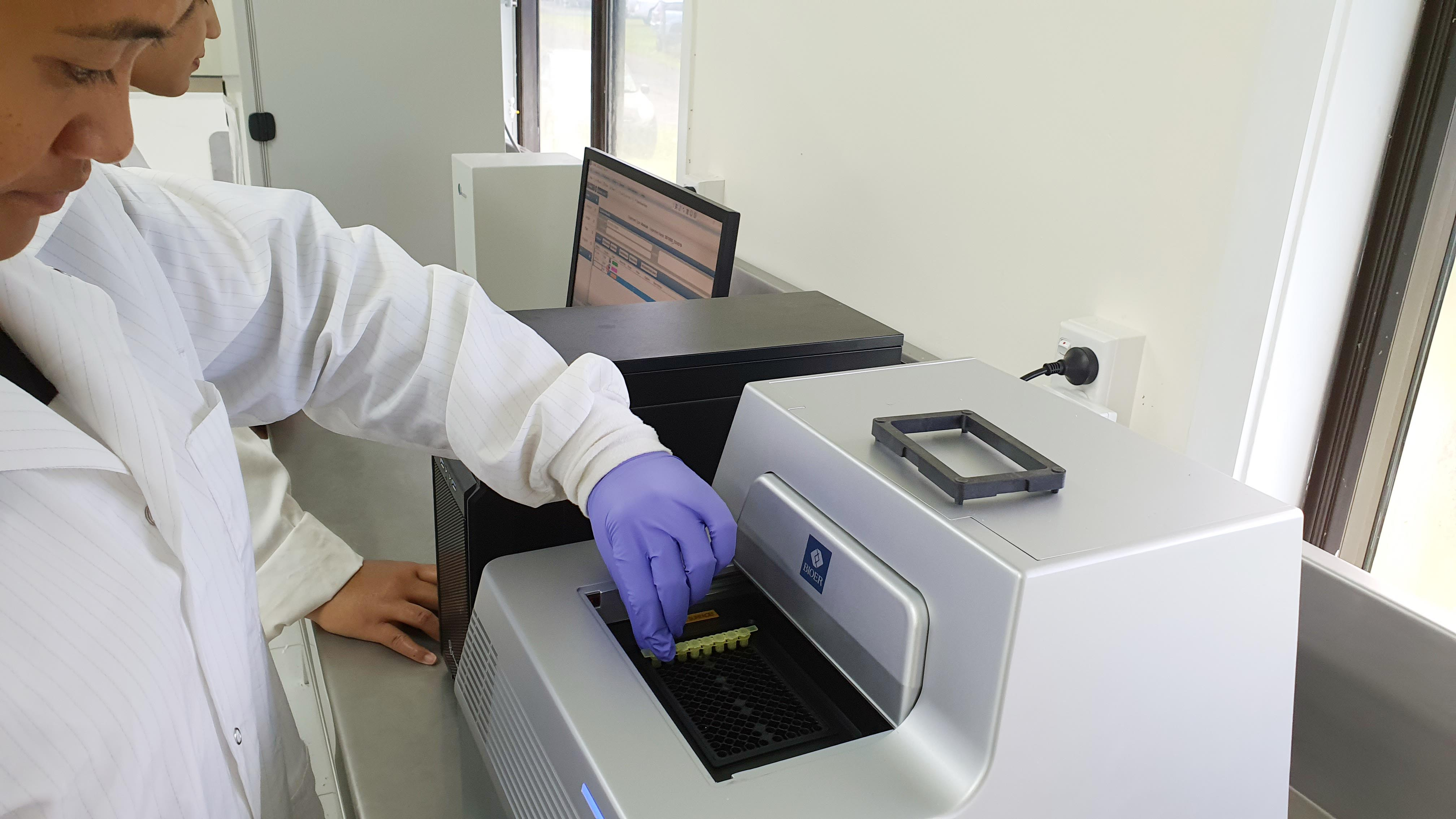
COVID-19 equipment used to rapidly find the COVID-19 virus

The institute's first chief executive was appointed on 15 July 2006, and its laboratories at Nafanua in Apia were officially opened on 29 May 2007.

The institute was renamed the Scientific Research Organisation of Samoa in 2008, and its objectives changed from supporting teaching to "ensur[ing] effective training for researchers and technical research". Its objectives were expanded in 2015 to include narcotics testing and environment impact assessments.

== Organisation ==
The organisation has 60 staff split across four divisions: Food Science and Technology, Environment and Renewable Energy, Plant and Postharvest Technologies, and Technical Services. A corporate services division is responsible for administration.
